The 2019 Sunshine Ladies Tour was the 6th season of the Sunshine Ladies Tour, a series of professional golf tournaments for women based in  South Africa.

Schedule
The season consisted of 12 events, 11 in South Africa and one in Eswatini, played as a block between January and May, plus two Vodacom Origins of Golf Series events in October.

Order of Merit
This shows the leaders in the final Order of Merit.

Source:

References

External links
Official homepage of the Sunshine Ladies Tour

Sunshine Ladies Tour
Sunshine Ladies Tour